Italy competed at the 1964 Winter Olympics in Innsbruck, Austria. They brought 61 competitors, 53 of whom were men and 8 of whom were women. A total of 4 medals were won, including 1 silver and 3 bronze.

Medalists

Alpine skiing

Men

Men's slalom

Women

Bobsleigh

Cross-country skiing

Men

Men's 4 × 10 km relay

Figure skating

Men

Women

Ice hockey

First round
Winners (in bold) qualified for the Group A to play for 1st-8th places. Teams, which lost their qualification matches, played in Group B for 9th-16th places.

|}

Consolation round 

Italy 6-4 Hungary
Yugoslavia 5-3 Italy
Norway 9-2 Italy
Poland 7-0 Italy
Austria 5-3 Italy
Romania 6-2 Italy
Italy 8-6 Japan

Luge

Men

(Men's) Doubles

Women

Nordic combined 

Events:
 normal hill ski jumping (Three jumps, best two counted and shown here.)
 15 km cross-country skiing

Ski jumping 

Athletes performed three jumps, the best two were counted and are shown here.

Speed skating

Men

References
Official Olympic Reports
International Olympic Committee results database
 Olympic Winter Games 1964, full results by sports-reference.com

Nations at the 1964 Winter Olympics
1964
1964 in Italian sport